The 2010–11 season was the 110th season in Athletic Bilbao's history and their 80th consecutive season in La Liga, the top division of Spanish football.

Squad statistics

Appearances and goals

|}

Competitions

La Liga

League table

Copa del Rey

External links
 

Athletic Bilbao
Athletic Bilbao seasons